Chariesthes albovariegata is a species of beetle in the family Cerambycidae. It was described by Stephan von Breuning in 1938, originally under the genus Pseudotragocephala. It is known from Somalia, Kenya and Ethiopia.

References

Chariesthes
Beetles described in 1938